Millennium Prize may refer to:

 Millennium Prize Problems of Clay Mathematics Institute
 Millennium Technology Prize of Finland